Riverstone may refer to:

Places
 Riverstone, New South Wales, a suburb of Sydney, Australia
 Riverstone railway station, Sydney
 Electoral district of Riverstone
 Riverstone High School
 Riverstone Terraces, a suburb of Upper Hutt, New Zealand
 Riverstone (Fort Bend County, Texas), a master-planned residential community in Sugar Land, Texas and Missouri City, Texas

Companies and organizations
 Riverstone Holdings, an energy and power focused private equity firm
 Riverstone International School, a school in Boise, Idaho
 Riverstone Networks, a computer networking company

Other
 Patuxent River stone, a gem
 Riverstone Pebble Tiles
 Riverstone, an album by Ten Mile Tide